The Arroyo del Medio (Spanish, lit. "Middle Creek" or "Middle Stream") is a small river of Argentina, located on (and serving as) the border between the provinces of Buenos Aires and Santa Fe. The Arroyo empties into the Paraná River at the city of San Nicolás de los Arroyos, Buenos Aires, opposite the Constitución Department in Santa Fe.

Rivers of Buenos Aires Province
Rivers of Santa Fe Province
Tributaries of the Paraná River
Rivers of Argentina